The 1938 United States Senate election in Washington was held on November 8, 1938. Incumbent Democratic U.S. Senator Homer Bone was re-elected to a second term in office over Republican Ewing D. Colvin.

Blanket primary
The blanket primary was held on September 13, 1938.

Candidates

Democratic
Homer Bone, incumbent Senator since 1933
Otto A. Case, former state Treasurer (1933–37) and candidate for Governor in 1936

Republican
Ewing D. Colvin
Howard E. Foster
Frank M. Goodwin, candidate for U.S. Senate in 1934

Results

General election

Candidates
 Ewing D. Colvin (Republican)
 Homer Bone, incumbent U.S. Senator since 1933 (Democratic)
 Eugene V. Solie (Socialist Labor)

Results

See also 
 1938 United States Senate elections

References 

1938
United States Senate
Washington